Kim Christiansen may refer to:

 Kim Christiansen (politician) (born 1956), Danish politician
 Kim Christiansen (snowboarder) (born 1976), Norwegian snowboarder